The Eddie Fisher Show is an American musical comedy/variety television series starring Eddie Fisher. The series alternated on Tuesday nights with The George Gobel Show with episodes running from October 1, 1957 – March 17, 1959 on NBC. George Gobel was a "permanent guest star" on Fisher's program, as Fisher was on Gobel's show. Debbie Reynolds, who was Fisher's wife at the time, occasionally was a guest star.

Synopsis

Singer and entertainer Eddie Fisher had just concluded a four-year run on NBC with a 15-minute variety and musical comedy series Coke Time with Eddie Fisher in 1957. NBC premiered The Eddie Fisher Show on October 1, 1957. The show alternated on Tuesday nights with The George Gobel Show airing from 8:00-9:00 pm for its entire run.

Cancellation

Fisher was married to actress Debbie Reynolds. The two divorced in 1959 and Fisher went on to marry Elizabeth Taylor. Fisher and Reynolds' divorce was very much publicized and after several months of scandals and unflattering publicity for Fisher, NBC decided to cancel the show with its last episode airing on March 27, 1959.

Personnel and production 
Buddy Bregman and his orchestra provided music on The Eddie Fisher Show In 1957-1958, The Bill Thompson Singers were on the show, as were The Johnny Mann Singers in 1959. Bregman also arranged music for the program. The theme song was "As Long As There's Musc" by Sammy Kahn and Jule Styne.

Guest stars on the program included The Lennon Sisters, Charles Laughton, Mike Todd, Terry Burnham, and Betty Grable.

References

External links

The Eddie Fisher Show at The Classic Television Archive with a list of episodes

1957 American television series debuts
1959 American television series endings
1950s American variety television series
Black-and-white American television shows
English-language television shows
NBC original programming